The Guard is a 1990 Soviet drama film  directed by Aleksandr Rogozhkin. It was entered into the 40th Berlin International Film Festival where it won the Alfred Bauer Prize. The film is shot entirely in sepia.

Plot
The film is based on the real story of a Soviet Internal Troops soldier who killed his entire unit (the karaul) as a result of Dedovschina. The plot unfolds mostly on board of the prisoner transport rail car guarded by a unit of paramilitary conscripts.

Cast
 Aleksey Buldakov as Paromov
 Sergei Kupriyanov as Andrej Iveren
 Aleksei Poluyan as Nikolai Mazur
 Aleksandr Smirnov as Private Khaustov
 Taras Denisenko as Boris Korchenuk
 Vasili Domrachyov as Private Nishchenkin
 Andrei Zertsalov as (as A. Zertsalov)
 Renat Ibragimov as Ibragimov
 Dmitri Iosifov as Alexey Zhokhin
 Valeri Kravchenko
 Aleksey Zaytsev

References

External links

1990 films
Soviet drama films
Lenfilm films
1990s Russian-language films
1990 drama films
Films directed by Aleksandr Rogozhkin
Rail transport films
Law enforcement in the Soviet Union